Muhammad Siddique (born 30 October 1948) is a Pakistani middle-distance runner. He competed in the men's 800 metres at the 1972 Summer Olympics.

References

External links
 

1948 births
Living people
Athletes (track and field) at the 1972 Summer Olympics
Athletes (track and field) at the 1976 Summer Olympics
Pakistani male middle-distance runners
Olympic athletes of Pakistan
Place of birth missing (living people)
Asian Games medalists in athletics (track and field)
Asian Games bronze medalists for Pakistan
Athletes (track and field) at the 1974 Asian Games
Medalists at the 1974 Asian Games
20th-century Pakistani people